The Delhi–Panipat Regional Rapid Transit System (Delhi–Panipat RRTS) is an approved,  long, semi-high speed rail corridor connecting Delhi, Sonipat, and Panipat in the National Capital Region. It is one of the three rapid-rail corridors planned under Phase-1 of the Rapid Rail Transport System of the National Capital Region Transport Corporation (NCRTC). With maximum speed of 160 km/h and average speed of 120 km/h, commuters using the system will be able to cover the distance between Panipat and Delhi in 65 minutes. The project is expected to cost  21,627 crores.

Route and stations

The line will start from Hazrat Nizamuddin station, which will allow interchange with Delhi-Alwar and Delhi-Meerut lines, as well as connectivity to the Nizamuddin railway station, Sarai Kale Khan ISBT and Sarai Kale Khan - Nizamuddin metro station. There will be total 16 stations on the corridor out of which two will be underground and the rest will be elevated.

Proposed extension to Karnal 

An extension to Karnal involving 3 additional stations has been proposed and the same is in feasibility stage.

Inter-connectivity 
 
It will connect with the following multi-model transports:

 Haryana Orbital Rail Corridor near Kundli
 National Highway 44 (India) (NH44), track will mostly run along NH44
 Western Peripheral Expressway interchange near Sonipat

Status
 
 19 July 2017 - NHAI granted in-principle approval.
 
 13 March 2020 - DPR approved by NCRTC Board.
 
 18 January 2021 - Delhi Panipat RRTS corridor approved by Government of Haryana.
 
 12 March 2021 - Process to identify Station land for extension to Karnal begins (3 more stations).
18 August 2021 - DPR lying with Central Government since Dec 2020.
14 Dec 2021 - Centre has not received the Delhi government’s approval for its financial commitment with regard to DPR of the Delhi-Panipat RRTS.
8 Feb 2023 - Delhi Government not agreed to provide financial support for Delhi-Panipat RRTS and Delhi-SNB RRTS,  and also hasn't made full payment for Delhi-Meerut RRTS.

See also 
 Delhi–Alwar Regional Rapid Transit System
 Delhi–Meerut Regional Rapid Transit System

References

External links 
 

Transport in Delhi
Transport in Haryana
Proposed railway lines in India
National Capital Region (India)
Rapid transit in India
Transport in Panipat